No Ways Tired is an album by the American soul musician Fontella Bass, released in 1995. Issued as part of Nonesuch's American Explorer Series (which focused on traditional American roots music), the album marked a return to Bass's beginnings in gospel.

The album was nominated for a Grammy Award, in the "Best Traditional Soul Gospel Album" category.

Production
No Ways Tired was produced by Wayne Horvitz. Lester Bowie, Harvey Brooks, and David Sanborn were among the musicians who contributed to the album. It includes covers of "Lean on Me" and "What the World Needs Now". Bass wrote "This Place I Call Home"; she also helped to arrange the songs.

Critical reception

The Chicago Reader wrote that "Bass's soprano ascents are as thrilling as ever; her easy phrasing echoes immortals like Mahalia and Aretha; and her years spent immersed in everything from major-label pop to the [Chicago Art Ensemble's] outward-bound art music have given her an unusually broad stylistic and emotional range." The New York Times thought that Bass's "voice is undiminished: a trumpet that peals out optimism."

The Ottawa Citizen determined that "Bass infuses 'What The World Needs Now' with some holy spirit, and cuts the Dionne Warwick version into bits." The Vancouver Sun opined that "not only is her instrument in top-notch condition, floating in and out of the melody with the grace of a skater, but the energetic instrumentation is a positive kick in the pants." The Washington Informer concluded that "the vocal abilities so evident in her 20's have come to full maturity at 54; the flourishing range and the expressiveness reveal an artist clearly at the height of her powers."

AllMusic wrote that "unlike Al Green, whose singing intensified when he reverted to gospel, Bass' gift has become more restrained."

Track listing

References

1995 albums
Nonesuch Records albums